Newbiggin-on-Lune is a village in the Eden district of Cumbria, England. Nearby to the north is located the Smardale Gill Viaduct on the dismantled former South Durham & Lancashire Union Railway between Tebay and Kirkby Stephen East railway station. To the south lies the Howgill Fells including Green Bell .

Governance
Newbiggin-on-Lune is in the parliamentary constituency of Penrith and The Border (UK Parliament constituency).

For purposes of local government, it is located in the Ravenstonedale Ward of Eden District Council and the Kirkby Stephen Ward of Cumbria County Council.

Newbiggin-on-Lune does not have its own parish council; instead it is part of Ravenstonedale Parish Council.

See also

Listed buildings in Ravenstonedale

External links

 Cumbria County History Trust: Ravenstonedale (nb: provisional research only – see Talk page)
Ravenstonedale and Newbiggin-on-Lune community website.

References

Villages in Cumbria
Ravenstonedale